Crack is the twelfth solo studio album by American rapper Z-Ro. It was released on September 16, 2008 via Rap-A-Lot Records, Warner Bros. Records and Asylum Records. Production was handled by Mr. Lee, Bigg Tyme, J. Moses, Cory Mo and Z-Ro himself. It features guest appearances from Lil' Keke, Mike D, Trae, Paul Wall and Slim Thug. The album chronicles the life story side of Z-Ro, like most of his albums. He stated that the streets would be hooked to the name of it. The chopped and screwed version of the album was done by Michael "5000" Watts and released on October 28, 2008.

Track listing

Sample credits
Top Notch
"The Overture of Foxy Brown" by Willie Hutch
"International Players Anthem (I Choose You)" by UGK
Rollin'
"Holding Back the Years" by Simply Red
25 Lighters
"25 Lighters" by DJ DMD featuring Lil' Keke & Fat Pat

Charts

References

External links

2008 albums
Z-Ro albums
Albums produced by Z-Ro
Rap-A-Lot Records albums